Oedaleonotus orientis is a species of spur-throated grasshopper in the family Acrididae. It is found in North America.

References

Further reading

 
 

Melanoplinae
Insects described in 1920